The men's 400 metres hurdles at the 1988 Summer Olympics in Seoul, South Korea had an entry list of 38 competitors, with five qualifying heats (38 runners) and two semifinals (16) before the final (8) took place on Sunday September 25, 1988. One athlete did not start, so there were 37 competitors from 28 nations. The maximum number of athletes per nation had been set at 3 since the 1930 Olympic Congress. The event was won by Andre Phillips of the United States, the nation's second consecutive and 14th overall victory in the event. Amadou Dia Ba earned Senegal's first medal in the event with his silver. Dia Ba broke up a potential American sweep, as 1976 and 1984 champion Edwin Moses took bronze and Kevin Young placed fourth. Moses was the second man to earn three medals in the event (after Morgan Taylor from 1924 to 1932).

Background

This was the 19th time the event was held. It had been introduced along with the men's 200 metres hurdles in 1900, with the 200 being dropped after 1904 and the 400 being held through 1908 before being left off the 1912 programme. However, when the Olympics returned in 1920 after World War I, the men's 400 metres hurdles was back and would continue to be contested at every Games thereafter.

Three of the eight finalists from the 1984 Games returned: gold medalist (and 1976 champion) Edwin Moses of the United States, bronze medalist Harald Schmid of West Germany, and fifth-place finisher Amadou Dia Bâ of Senegal. Fourth-place finisher Sven Nylander of Sweden was entered but did not start. Moses had won over 100 consecutive finals in nearly 10 years starting in August 1977, but had finally been beaten in June 1987. No longer unbeatable, Moses had still won the 1987 World Championships and the 1988 U.S. Olympic trials—both very strong fields.

Barbados, Fiji, Honduras, Nepal, Sierra Leone, and South Korea each made their debut in the event. The United States made its 18th appearance, most of any nation, having missed only the boycotted 1980 Games.

Competition format

The competition used the three-round format used every Games since 1908 (except the four-round competition in 1952): quarterfinals, semifinals, and a final. Ten sets of hurdles were set on the course. The hurdles were 3 feet (91.5 centimetres) tall and were placed 35 metres apart beginning 45 metres from the starting line, resulting in a 40 metres home stretch after the last hurdle. The 400 metres track was standard.

There were 5 quarterfinal heats with between 7 and 8 athletes each. The top 3 men in each quarterfinal advanced to the semifinals along with the next fastest 1 overall. The 16 semifinalists were divided into 2 semifinals of 8 athletes each, with the top 4 in each semifinal advancing to the 8-man final.

Records

These were the standing world and Olympic records (in seconds) prior to the 1988 Summer Olympics.

Andre Phillips set a new Olympic record in the final with a time of 47.19 seconds.

Schedule

All times are Korea Standard Time adjusted for daylight savings (UTC+10)

Results

Quarterfinals

The quarterfinals were held on Friday September 23, 1988.

Quarterfinal 1

Quarterfinal 2

Quarterfinal 3

Quarterfinal 4

Quarterfinal 5

Semifinals

The semifinals were held on Saturday September 24, 1988.

Semifinal 1

Semifinal 2

Final

Results summary

See also
 1987 Men's World Championships 400m Hurdles (Rome)
 1990 Men's European Championships 400m Hurdles (Split)
 1991 Men's World Championships 400m Hurdles (Tokyo)

References

External links
  Official Report

 1
400 metres hurdles at the Olympics
Men's events at the 1988 Summer Olympics